The Gallen-Kallela Museum, located in Tarvaspää, Espoo, Finland, and built between 1911 and 1913 was a home and studio for Finnish painter Akseli Gallen-Kallela. The atelier building has been a museum since 1961.

Gallery

References

External links
 
 

Buildings and structures in Espoo
Art museums and galleries in Finland
National Romantic architecture in Finland
Biographical museums in Finland
Museums in Uusimaa
Art Nouveau houses
Houses in Finland
Houses completed in 1913
1913 establishments in Finland